Guaramirim is a municipality in the state of Santa Catarina in the South region of Brazil.

Notable people
Julio Cesar Football player

See also
List of municipalities in Santa Catarina

References

Municipalities in Santa Catarina (state)